Allacma is a genus of arthropods belonging to the family Sminthuridae.

The genus was first described by Börner in 1906.

The species of this genus are found in Europe and Northern America.

Species:
 Allacma fusca (Linnaeus, 1758)

References

Collembola
Springtail genera